Azueira e Sobral da Abelheira is a civil parish in the municipality of Mafra, Portugal. It was formed in 2013 by the merger of the former parishes Azueira and Sobral da Abelheira. The population in 2011 was 4,316, in an area of 30.63 km².

Patrimony 

 Solar da Quinta do Pato ou Quinta da Família Pato e Cunha ou Quinta do Pato
 Capela de Santa Cristina e Cruzeiro adjacente
 Igreja de São Pedro de Grilhões
 Igreja Paroquial
 Ermida de Nossa Senhora do Codeçal
 Tapada Nacional de Mafra
 Quinta da Abelheira
 Quinta dos Brigadeiros

References

Freguesias of Mafra, Portugal